Melodi Grand Prix Nordic 2008 was the fourth Nordic Melodi Grand Prix, a Scandinavian song contest for children aged 8 to 15. The contest was held on November 29, 2008 in Aarhus, Denmark and the participating countries were Norway, Sweden, Denmark and Finland. Each country submitted two songs to participate in the first round with the top placing entry from each country proceeding to the super-final. The winner of the MGP Nordic 2008 was Norway's The BlackSheeps with "Oro jaska beana".

Format 
Each country partakes in a national selection for MGP Nordic. The top two songs from each country proceed to MGP Nordic. Eight songs participate in the contest to make it more substantial. All eight songs in the Final are performed. After the eight songs have been performed the Scandinavian countries vote for their favourite. After the voting has closed, the top song from each participating country is announced. The top four songs then sing again in the Super Final. The Scandinavian countries then vote again for their favourites. The winner is announced after the second round of voting has taken place. The voting system is different from the Eurovision and the Junior Eurovision Song Contest. It is also different from the Eurovision Dance Contest, making it unique in European contests. The percentage of votes given by a country is translated directly into points, e.g. 21% equals 21 points. No country can get nil points as each country gives points to every country. A country cannot vote for themselves, like in the Eurovision contests. The winning contestant then sings again as the credits roll.

National selections
 Norway decided: 5 September 2008
 Denmark decided: 20 September 2008
 Sweden decided: 4 October 2008
 Finland decided: 31 October 2008

Participants

Denmark 
The Johanssons consist of brothers Mattias and Marcus. Their song "En for alle, alle for en", which means One for all, all for one, is a pop-rock song about the need to care for each other.
Sandra Monique's song "Hola chica" which means "Hey Girl", is about friendship at a distance. Sandra, aged 12 at the time, is a big fan of Lil Mama and Chris Brown. In her spare time she practices gymnastics, singing and dancing. In the future she hopes to become a singer or a photographer.

Finland 
Footboys is a singing duo from Finland, consisting of friends Anton and Ivar. Like the duo's name suggests, the members are very interested in football and the song "Fotboll" is about their love for said sport.
No fewer than six band members are in the group Big Bang. The six friends competed with a contribution entitled "Här är vi", which means "Here We Are" and the song is about their love for music. The band's name is not to be confused with the South Korean boy band of the same name.

Norway 
"Oro jaska beana" is the song sung by The BlackSheeps. The song title roughly means Be quiet/shut up dog and is about a dog that is fat and unhealthy and eventually dies from high blood pressure. The group consists of three girls and a boy, between the ages of 14 and 15 at the time of the contest. Lead singer Agnete Johnsen later represented Norway in the Eurovision Song Contest 2016 with the song "Icebreaker".
The Battery consists of four fourteen-year-old boys. The boys have performed together since December 2006 and have written over 10 songs as a band. One of them is the song "Tenke nå", which means "Think Now", and deals with climate issues. The song invites us to reflect on what actually is happening to the environment and nature and that it is time to do something about global warming. In October 2008, the band gained a new member to play the bass guitar.

Sweden 
Linn, aged 15 at the time, was raised in Falun and plays both violin and piano. She usually writes her songs on the piano. In her spare time she watches films and listens to Evanescence.
When fourteen-year-old Jonna from Färgelanda listens to music, it is often Avril Lavigne songs. Jonna describes herself as a positive girl who likes to be with her friends and also likes to sing. A rare talent she has is that she can "tremble" with her eyes.

Final 
Each of the Scandinavian countries were represented by two artists. The artist with the most votes from each country proceeded to the Super Final. The qualifiers were the Johanssons from Denmark, Footboys from Finland, The BlackSheeps from Norway, and Jonna from Sweden.

Running order from YLE

Super-final 
Each super finalist sang their songs again for the Scandinavian public. The viewers then voted for the second time whilst the second interval act took place. This included the participants singing a medley containing excerpts from songs about music. The results were announced by puppets for each country. Each song gained points depending on the percentage of votes they won from each country. Norway won by a landslide with 74 points more than second-placed host country Denmark.

Scoreboard

Voting

References

External links 
 Finnish Broadcaster YLE
 Swedish Broadcaster SVT
 Norwegian Broadcaster NRK
 Danish Broadcaster DR

MGP Nordic
2008 in Danish television
2008 in Swedish music
2008 in Norwegian music
2008 in Swedish television
2008 song contests
2008 in Danish music
2008 in Finnish television
2008 in Norwegian television
2008 in Finnish music